Timothy Schofield (born 1954) is an English priest of the Church of England . He is the current precentor of Chichester Cathedral in West Sussex.

Educated at Durham University and Christ's College, Cambridge, Schofield taught music at Exeter School before his ordination. Before his 2006 appointment to Chichester Cathedral, he ministered in the Exeter and St Albans dioceses.

References

Chichester Cathedral
Living people
Alumni of Christ's College, Cambridge
1954 births
Alumni of St John's College, Durham